Lafayette Township is the name of four townships in the U.S. state of Indiana:

 Lafayette Township, Allen County, Indiana
 Lafayette Township, Floyd County, Indiana
 Lafayette Township, Madison County, Indiana
 Lafayette Township, Owen County, Indiana

Indiana township disambiguation pages